The Women's 50 metre rifle 3 positions SH1 event at the 2012 Summer Paralympics took place on 6 September at the Royal Artillery Barracks in Woolwich.

The event consisted of two rounds: a qualifier and a final. In the qualifier, each shooter fired 20 shots with a rifle at 50 metres distance from each of the prone, "standing" and kneeling positions. Scores for each shot were in increments of 1, with a maximum score of 10.

The top 8 shooters in the qualifying round moved on to the final round. There, they fired an additional 10 shots in the standing position. These shots scored in increments of .1, with a maximum score of 10.9. The total score from all 70 shots was used to determine final ranking.

Qualification round

Q Qualified for final

Final

References

Shooting at the 2012 Summer Paralympics
Para